Rudbast (also Romanized as Rūdbast; also known as Gāv Zan Kolā and Gavzan Maḩalleh) is a village in Babolrud Rural District, in the Central District of Babolsar County, Mazandaran Province, Iran. At the 2006 census, its population was 2,036, in 547 families.

References 

Populated places in Babolsar County